The Needham Research Institute (NRI), located on the grounds of Robinson College, in Cambridge, England, is a centre for research into the history of science, technology and medicine in East Asia. The institute is named after the biochemist and historian Joseph Needham, who initiated the Science and Civilisation in China series. The current director is Mei Jianjun, a noted archaeo-metallurgist.

The organization was founded as the East Asian History of Science Trust in August 1968. In June 1983 the trustees conferred the title Needham Research Institute. The Trustees of the NRI is a registered charity.

The institute grew out of Needham's research collection, which was originally housed in Gonville and Caius College, where he was Master until his retirement in 1976. After several moves, it moved into its current purpose-built structure in Robinson College in 1991. The building was designed in the Chinese style, and has been described by its architect as "East Anglian Asian".

List of directors 
 Joseph Needham 1983-1990
 Ho Peng Yoke February 1990-2001
 Christopher Cullen October 2003-December 2013
 Mei Jianjun January 2014-

References

External links 
 Needham Research Institute

Organisations associated with the University of Cambridge
History of East Asia
History of medicine
Research institutes in Cambridge
Joseph Needham